Helmut Brunner (born 8 May 1961 in Stilfs) was an Italian luger who competed in the early 1980s. He won the gold medal in the men's doubles event at the 1984 FIL European Luge Championships in Olang, Italy.

References

External links
 

Italian male lugers
Living people
Italian lugers
1961 births
Olympic lugers of Italy
Lugers at the 1984 Winter Olympics
People from Stilfs
Sportspeople from Südtirol